Gliotoxin is a sulfur-containing mycotoxin that belongs to a class of naturally occurring 2,5-diketopiperazines produced by several species of  fungi, especially those of marine origin.  It is the most prominent member of the epipolythiopiperazines, a large class of natural products featuring a diketopiperazine with di- or polysulfide linkage.  These highly bioactive compounds have been the subject of numerous studies aimed at new therapeutics.  Gliotoxin was originally isolated from Gliocladium fimbriatum, and was named accordingly. It is an epipolythiodioxopiperazine metabolite.

Occurrence
The compound is produced by human pathogens such as Aspergillus fumigatus, and also by species of Trichoderma and Penicillium. Gliotoxin has also been reported from yeasts of the genus Candida, but results from other studies have cast doubt on the production of this metabolite by Candida fungi.

Mechanism of action

Gliotoxin is suspected to be an important virulence factor (aka pathogenicity factor) in Aspergillus fungus. Gliotoxin possesses immunosuppressive properties that may suppress and cause apoptosis in certain cells of the immune system, including neutrophils, eosinophils, granulocytes, macrophages, and thymocytes. Specifically, neutrophils exposed to gliotoxin release less reactive oxygen species (ROS) and complete fewer phagocytic activities. Gliotoxin is also believed to interfere with T-cell activation. Additionally, gliotoxin acts as an inhibitor of farnesyl transferase. It noncompetitively inhibits the chymotrypsin-like activity of the 20S proteasome.

In vivo gliotoxin displays anti-inflammatory activity. It was investigated as an antibiotic and antifungal in the 1940s and as an antiviral agent. Gliotoxin inactivates many different enzymes, including nuclear factor-κB (NF-κB), NADPH oxidase, and glutaredoxin. The inhibition of NF-κB leads prevents cytokine release and induction of the inflammatory response.

The immunosuppressive properties of gliotoxin are due to the disulfide bridge within its structure. Interactions occur between sulfur molecules that make up the disulfide bridge and thiol groups contained in cysteine residues. Gliotoxin acts by blocking thiol residues in the cell membrane. Gliotoxin also activates a member of the Bcl-2 family called Bak in order to mediate cell apoptosis. Activated Bak then causes the release of ROS, which form pores within the mitochondrial membrane. These pores allow the release of cytochrome C and AIF, which initiate apoptosis within the cell.

Biosynthesis
In Aspergillus fumigatus, the enzymes needed for gliotoxin biosynthesis are encoded in 13 genes within the gli gene cluster. When this gene cluster is activated, these enzymes mediate the production of gliotoxin from serine and phenylalanine residues.

Enzymes Involved in Biosynthesis (in order of activity) 

GliZ: transcription factor that regulates expression of gli gene cluster

GliP: facilitates formation of cyclo-phenylalanyl-serine intermediate from serine and
phenylalanine residues

GliC: adds hydroxyl group to the alpha carbon of the phenylalanine residue in the
cyclo-phenylalanyl-serine intermediate

GliG: glutathione S-transferase (GST) that adds two glutathione molecules forming a
bis-glutathionylated intermediate

GliK: gamma-glutamyl transferase that removes gamma-glutamyl moieties from
glutathione additions

GliN: adds a methyl group to nitrogen to form the dithiol gliotoxin intermediate

GliT: oxidoreductase that mediates closure of the disulfide-bridge

GliA: Major Facilitator Superfamily transporter that secretes gliotoxin across cell membrane

Enzymes GliJ, GliI, GliF, and GliH are necessary for biosynthesis, but their exact function is unknown.

Regulation of Biosynthesis

Some gliotoxin molecules are not secreted by GliA and remain in the cell. This intracellular gliotoxin activates the transcription factor GliZ, facilitating gli gene cluster expression, and an enzyme called GtmA. GtmA acts as a negative regulator for gliotoxin biosynthesis by adding methyl groups to the two sulfur residues on the dithiol gliotoxin intermediate. These additions prevent the formation of the disulfide
bridge by GliT, inhibiting gliotoxin formation.

Exposure and health effects

Environmental exposure 

Exposure to fungal species that secrete gliotoxin is common because airborne Aspergillus fungal spores are ubiquitous in many environments. Regular environmental exposure does not typically cause illness, but can cause serious infections in immunosuppressed individuals or those with chronic respiratory illnesses. Infection caused by Aspergillus fungus is called aspergillosis. There are many types of aspergillosis, but infections typically affect the lungs or the sinuses.

Gliotoxin is hypothesized to be an important virulence factor in Aspergillus fumigatus. Experiments have demonstrated that gliotoxin is isolated in the highest concentrations from Aspergillus fumigatus in comparison to other Aspergillus species. This species of fungi is the most common cause of aspergillosis in humans. Gliotoxin is also the only toxin that has been isolated from the sera of patients with invasive aspergillosis. These results suggest a link between gliotoxin secretion and fungal pathogenicity.

While not enough data exists to definitively tie chronic gliotoxin exposure to the development of cancer, chronic exposure to other immunosuppressive agents has been linked to the development of lymphomas and mammary tumors. Individuals taking immunosuppressive medications or with previous or current exposure to chemotherapy radiation are at higher risk for the development of these tumors.

Clinical exposure 

Gliotoxin is toxic if swallowed or inhaled, and can cause skin and eye irritation if exposure occurs to these areas. The oral  of gliotoxin is 67 mg/kg. Acute symptoms of gliotoxin start rapidly after ingestion.

References

Further reading
 
 
 
 
 
 

Antibiotics
Mycotoxins
Immunosuppressants
Indoles
Lactams
Primary alcohols
Secondary alcohols
Diketopiperazines
Organic disulfides
Conjugated dienes